Mongolia competed at the 2022 World Games held in Birmingham, United States from 7 to 17 July 2022. Athletes representing Mongolia won one silver medal and the country finished in 63rd place in the medal table.

Medalists

Competitors
The following is the list of number of competitors in the Games.

Powerlifting

Mongolia competed in powerlifting.

Sumo

Mongolia won one silver medal in sumo.

References

Nations at the 2022 World Games
2022
World Games